Five ships of the Royal Navy have been named HMS Beacon:

, a fireship, previously the mercantile Duff purchased in 1804 and sold in 1808.
, a  launched in 1823 as HMS Meteor. She became a survey ship in 1832 and was renamed HMS Beacon. She was sold in 1846.
, a bomb vessel launched in 1855 and renamed MV.16 later that year. She was reclassified as a dockyard lighter in 1862.
, an  launched in 1856 and broken up in 1864.
, a  launched in 1867 and sold in 1888.

See also
Beacon (disambiguation)
, planned as Beacon, assigned to the UK but reassigned to the US Navy in 1943. Later reassigned again to the Royal Navy and commissioned as HMS Dittany

References

Royal Navy ship names